The Antietam Formation or Antietam Sandstone is a geologic formation in Pennsylvania, Maryland and West Virginia. It is largely quartz sandstone with some quartzite and quartz schist. It preserves Skolithos trace fossils dating back to the Cambrian Period.

References

Cambrian Maryland
Cambrian geology of Pennsylvania
Cambrian West Virginia
Cambrian south paleopolar deposits